John Stewart Wynne (a.k.a. John Wynne) is an American author of novels, short stories and poetry, as well as a Grammy-nominated producer of spoken word recordings.

His writing often depicts characters in extremis, outsiders adrift in a conformist landscape, in plots that juxtapose the surreal and naturalistic.  He has been hailed as the heir apparent to the tradition of "outsider art" exemplified by Tennessee Williams, Carson McCullers and Truman Capote.

Career

Novels
Wynne's first novel Crime Wave details the unexpected love affair between a photojournalist (Jake Adams) and a woman (Renee Cloverman) living in a Manhattan brothel.  Jake attempts to make Renee respectable by moving her into the country with his aunt's family where her presence turns out to be a risk not only for her but for them as well. It was praised by author Barbara Trapido in The Spectator as a "disturbing, well-written and impressive work whose genre is Manhattan lumpen Gothic...the book has a terrible and compelling beauty."  Author Jenny Uglow in The Times Literary Supplement wrote "Crime Wave is about personal and social sado-masochism.  The author's challenging aim is to show there is no such thing as 'mindless violence', whether directed towards the self or towards others.  Each aggressive act is the result of a long cycle of action and reaction, continued through generations.  Crime Wave is an ambitious first novel."

Magnus Books published Wynne's second novel The Red Shoes in July 2013.  "The Red Shoes, set in contemporary New York City, is a beautifully dark queer re-visioning of the Hans Christian Andersen fairy tale of the same title.  Wynne immediately engages the reader with finely detailed descriptions, nuanced character development, and an air of mystery that makes the 428-page text read like a novella,” wrote Jamie Jones in Lambda Literary.

Kate Christensen, winner of the PEN/Faulkner Best American Work of Fiction Award for The Great Man, said:  "I read this so fast I got blisters turning pages.  The Red Shoes is so astonishingly good, original, beautiful and amazing...I love the Gothic feeling of impending doom and the counterbalancing elements of light.  Wynne's writing is free of compromise, fear.  He has the rare ability to write on a plane floating just above life, or below it.  And his voice doesn't sound like anyone else's.  I think The Red Shoes is a great work of art."  Ben Schrank, president and publisher of Razorbill, a Penguin imprint, and author of the novel Love Is a Canoe, wrote that "The narrator is as fully realized and endearing a character as I've ever known."  
Stephen D. Adams, author of The Homosexual as Hero said, "I loved the mysteriousness of everything and everybody in The Red Shoes and the way its preoccupations with loss, danger and safety would loom in and out of view in the surreal fog of drugs, sex and dark humor.  I found it quite haunting and didn't want it to end."

In 2014 The Red Shoes was nominated for a Lambda Literary Award in the Gay Fiction category.

In 2018, the author announced on his website that he has finished a new novel.

Spoken word

Wynne has also produced and directed over one hundred audio books, including The Phantom of the Opera performed by F. Murray Abraham, William Styron reading his Darkness Visible (memoir), Christopher Reeve performing F. Scott Fitzgerald's The Great Gatsby and John F. Kennedy, Jr. reading his father's Pulitzer Prize-winning book Profiles in Courage.  The latter was nominated for the 1991 Grammy Award as Best Spoken Word Album.  Wynne himself was nominated for the Grammy Award in 1995 as producer of Best Spoken Word Album for Children for The Magic School Bus:  Fun with Sound, featuring Lily Tomlin.

In 1995 Wynne authored the first popular guide to spoken word recordings, The Listener's Guide to Audio Books.

Short fiction
Wynne's first published fiction was the 1978 short story The Sighting, where flying saucers and Bela Lugosi rub up against an archetypal 1950s drive-in while counterpointing the blossoming relationship of two teen-age boys.  Gordon Montador in The Body Politic enthused:  "There is nothing else quite like it, for no other writer has experimented with gay experience in the context of our adolescence in straight America in such a direct, sensual and imaginative manner."  The Sighting was further praised by Hubert Selby Jr., 1980 Prix Goncourt winner Yves Navarre, Rita Mae Brown, James Purdy and Charles Palliser.  The story was selected by Ian Young as one of the seminal works of gay literature in his The Male Homosexual in Literature:  A Bibliography.

Wynne's short story collection The Other World, peopled with circus performers, sociopaths, cross-dressing teenagers and God-fearing families, was described as "one of the best books of the decade" by The James White Review.  Details magazine wrote, "Wynne's prose is chiseled and precise.  And in pages that tremble with beauty, Wynne gracefully reveals the darker side of human possibilities."  Booklist called it "startling, outrageous, frightening and sometimes even funny."  National Book Award-winner Paul Monette wrote, "With so much tepid and sentimental fiction coming out, Wynne's stories are like a plunge in cold water.  With a near-Brechtian intensity of focus and an infallible ear for dialogue, Wynne casts a laser eye on the things we say, so different from what we mean.  A book to handle with asbestos gloves, but well worth the walk through fire."  Lambda Award-winner Rebecca Brown called it "an incredibly powerful book."

Wynne's other short fiction and poetry have appeared in The Paris Review, The American Poetry Review, Christopher Street and High Risk 2, among other publications.

Bibliography
Opera in Santa Fe (poem), Concept:  An Anthology of Contemporary American Writing, New London Press, 1978
The Sighting (short story), Tree Line Books, 1978.   
Two Struggling Actresses (poem), The Paris Review, Issue 76, Fall 1979
Shoal (poem), The Nantucket Review, Issue 14, 1979
Moonlight (poem), The American Poetry Review, Vol. 8/No. 6, November/December 1979
The Sighting (short story) and Nameless Thing (short story), New Writing and Writers 17, John Calder, 1980 
Crime Wave:  A Novel (novel), John Calder/Riverrun Press, 1982 
Afternoon (short story), Christopher Street, Issue 87, 1984
Haiku (poem), Bastard Review, Issue 5/6, 1992
The Other World:  Stories (short story collection), City Lights, 1994.  Contents:  The Other World, Nameless Thing, Raphael, Lights of Broadway, Halloween Card and Vulture
The Other World (short story), High Risk 2, Plume/Penguin Books, 1994
The Listener's Guide to Audio Books:  Reviews, Recommendations, and Listings for More Than 2,000 Titles (non-fiction book), Fireside Books/Simon & Schuster, 1995
The Needles Highway (short story), Untreed Reads, 2012
A Night in the Pampas (short story), Year's End, Untreed Reads, 2012 
The Other World:  Stories (revised short story collection), Untreed Reads, 2013.  Contents:  The Other World, Nameless Thing, Raphael, Lights of Broadway, Halloween Card and Vulture
The Red Shoes (novel), Magnus Books, 2013

Audiography

Produced and directed over 100 audio books including:

Fitzgerald, F. Scott.  The Great Gatsby, Durkin Hayes, 1992.  Performed by Christopher Reeve.

Kennedy, John F.  Profiles in Courage, Caedmon, 1990.  Read by John F. Kennedy, Jr.

Leroux, Gaston.  The Phantom of the Opera, Caedmon, 1988.  Performed by F. Murray Abraham.

Styron, William.  Darkness Visible:  A Memoir of Madness, Random House Audio, 1990.  Read by William Styron.

Waters, John.  Shock Value, Caedmon, 1989.  Performed by John Waters.

References

Living people
20th-century American novelists
Postmodern writers
American gay writers
20th-century American poets
American male novelists
American male poets
American male short story writers
20th-century American short story writers
American LGBT novelists
American LGBT poets
20th-century American male writers
Year of birth missing (living people)
Gay poets